Formed in 1981 from the ashes of Worksop band Veiled Threat, singer Elaine McLeod, bassist Derek Taylor and drummer Nigel Fitzpatrick recruited Nick Robinson on guitar to form Red Zoo. Nigel was replaced by Tich Critchlow, Derek by Les Heath (former Veiled Threat guitarist) and upon signing to Polydor Records, the band renamed to Typhoon Saturday. Three singles were released, the third of which featured a sax solo from Raphael Ravenscroft (of "Baker Street" fame) but the band split. Tich formed Living in a Box with a friend of Les's. Nick went on to play with the Comsat Angels and Neil Ardley and is now an internationally famous origamist Nick Robinson (origami).

Discography

Singles 
 "What Do I Do" / "Fascination" – 1982 Polydor POSP413
 "Another Flight" / "Let's All Dance" – 1982 Polydor POSP442
 "I Have Love" / "Social Insecurity" – 1982 Polydor POSP501

External links 
 
 
 

English indie rock groups